Grinyov is a rural locality (a khutor) in Solonetskoye Rural Settlement, Vorobyovsky District, Voronezh Oblast, Russia. The population was 229 as of 2010. There are 3 streets.

Geography 
Grinyov is located 23 km west of Vorobyovka (the district's administrative centre) by road. Solontsy is the nearest rural locality.

References 

Rural localities in Vorobyovsky District